John Latton (1484/85–1548), of the Inner Temple, London and Upton in Berkshire (now Oxfordshire), was an English politician.

Latton was MP for Oxford in 1529 and 1539.

References

1485 births
1548 deaths
Members of the Inner Temple
People from Vale of White Horse (district)
Politicians from London
English MPs 1529–1536
English MPs 1539–1540
Politicians from Oxfordshire